Laser League is a futuristic sports video game by Roll7, the creators of OlliOlli. Two teams of one, two or three players apiece compete to outlast their opponents by setting up moving lasers in an arena. The game was released in early access during 2017, and officially released for PlayStation 4, Windows, and Xbox One platforms in 2018.

Release 
An early access version of Laser League was released for Windows on February 8, 2018, following several closed and open beta iterations. The full version of Laser League was released for Windows, PlayStation 4, and Xbox One on May 10, 2018.

On August 24, 2018, Roll7 transferred Laser League development responsibilities to their publisher, 505 Games.

Reception

Critical 

Laser League received positive reviews from critics. On Metacritic, the game holds scores of 78/100 for the PC version based on 5 reviews, 82/100 for the PlayStation 4 version based on 27 reviews, and 81/100 for the Xbox One version based on 11 reviews.

Accolades

References

Further reading

External links 

 

2018 video games
Early access video games
505 Games games
Roll7 games
PlayStation 4 games
Windows games
Xbox One games
Indie video games
Sports video games
Multiplayer video games
Video games developed in the United Kingdom